A newt is an aquatic animal.

Newt may also refer to:

 Newt (name), a list of people and fictional characters with the given name or nickname
 Newt, Kentucky, an unincorporated community
 HMS Newt (shore establishment), a British Second World War shore establishment
 Newt (programming library), a library for text-mode user interfaces
 Newt (film), a planned animated Pixar film cancelled in 2010 and merged with 2015 film Inside Out
 Nastily Exhausting Wizarding Test (N.E.W.T.), a test of magical aptitude in the Harry Potter series
 Newt (band), a collaboration between Daniel Myer and Andreas Meyer